Eslamabad-e Darvish Khanka (also Romanized as Eslāmābād-e Darvīsh Khānkā; also known as Eslāmābād) is a village in Golashkerd Rural District, in the Central District of Faryab County, Kerman Province, Iran. At the 2006 census, its population was 40, in 9 families.

References 

Populated places in Faryab County